Tan Sri Datuk Seri Mhd Amin Nordin bin Abdul Aziz (born 1 August 1955) is a Malaysian civil servant who served as mayor of Kuala Lumpur from 2015 to 2018.

Career
Nordin was the Director-General of Kuala Lumpur City Hall before his appointment to the mayoral office (prior to that, he was also already a senior experienced civil servant in different government departments and ministries). He was appointed Mayor of Kuala Lumpur by Tengku Adnan Tengku Mansor, then-Minister of Federal Territories to succeed Ahmad Phesal Talib, who decided to take mandatory retirement upon reaching 60 years of age and not having a desire to renew his contract.

Honours

Honours of Malaysia
  :
  Commander of the Order of Meritorious Service (PJN) – Datuk  (2015) 
 Commander of the Order of Loyalty to the Crown of Malaysia (PSM) – Tan Sri (2017)
 :
  Knight Commander of the Order of the Territorial Crown (PMW) – Datuk (2009)
 Grand Commander of the Order of the Territorial Crown (SMW) – Datuk Seri (2015)

References

1955 births
Living people
Mayors of Kuala Lumpur
Malaysian Muslims
Malaysian people of Malay descent
University of Malaya alumni
Commanders of the Order of Loyalty to the Crown of Malaysia
Malaysian people of Minangkabau descent
Commanders of the Order of Meritorious Service